Larysa Aleksandrivna Karlova (born 7 August 1958 in Kiev) is a former Ukrainian handball player who competed in the 1976 Summer Olympics, in the 1980 Summer Olympics, and in the 1988 Summer Olympics. One of the most outstanding players in the history of handball.

In 1976, she won the gold medal with the Soviet team. She played all five matches and scored one goal.

Four years later, she was a member of the Soviet team which won the gold medal again. She played all five matches and scored 19 goals.

In 1988, she won the bronze medal as part of the Soviet team. She played all five matches and scored seven goals.

External links
profile

1958 births
Living people
Soviet female handball players
Ukrainian female handball players
Handball players at the 1976 Summer Olympics
Handball players at the 1980 Summer Olympics
Handball players at the 1988 Summer Olympics
Olympic handball players of the Soviet Union
Olympic gold medalists for the Soviet Union
Olympic bronze medalists for the Soviet Union
Olympic medalists in handball
Sportspeople from Kyiv
Medalists at the 1988 Summer Olympics
Medalists at the 1980 Summer Olympics
Medalists at the 1976 Summer Olympics
Soviet expatriate sportspeople in Yugoslavia
Ukrainian expatriate sportspeople in Italy